Pterygiopsis is a genus of fungi within the family Lichinaceae. It contains 11 species.

References

Lichinomycetes
Lichen genera
Taxa named by Edvard August Vainio